Sanganer is a town/ Tehsil (an administrative division) situated in Jaipur district, Rajasthan, 16 km south of state capital Jaipur. Jaipur has been divided in 13 Sub divisions and Sanganer is one of these 13 Sub divisions. It is famous for textile printing, handmade paper industry, and for Jain temples. Sanganer prints are one of its own kinds, for the reason that the patterns in bright colours are always printed on white backgrounds. Sanganeri Hand block printing received the geographical indication (GI) tag in 2010.

The handmade paper industry began with the idea of Maharaja Sawai Jai Singh II in 1728. Around ten handmade paper industries are present in Sanganer. Krishan Lal Balmiki the member of Rajya Sabha, was also from Sanganer (born 10 July 1942, died 21 April 2010). Sanganer is also a legislative assembly of Rajasthan and current MLA of Sanganer is Ashok Lahoti.

The nearby located is one of the biggest Rajasthan housing board colony, Pratap Nagar. EPIP (Export Promotion Industrial Park) Sitapura is also located in this place. Muhana and Muhana Mandi is 6 km from town.

Infrastructure 
Jaipur Airport is located in Sanganer. Ch Charan Singh National Institute of Agricultural Marketing (NIAM) and Indian Institute of Health Management Research (IIHMR) are two institutes located in Sanganer.

Textiles of Sanganer 
The history of the Sanganeri prints is around 500 years old. The origin of these prints came around during the 16th and 17th centuries. And by the end of the 18th century, Sanganer was a well-established production house of these block printing textiles.

The Sanganeri prints are widely known for their delicate and fine designs. Originally, Sanganeri prints used to be created on a white and off white fabrics. However, nowadays, other fabrics are also being used as bases.

The prints of Sanganer comprise delicate floral patterns. These flower motifs are generally known as 'Buttas'. The elaborate detailing of the flowers and the petals is very exclusive to the Sanganeri prints.

Today, the textile market of Sanganer is famous in India and around the world for its unique blend of traditional and traditional styles of printing.

Places of historical importance 

Sanganer is a famous pilgrimage town for the Jain community because of a very ancient Jain temple made of red stone. The ancient Shri Digamber Jain temple of Sanganer is 16 km from Jaipur. In this temple the principal deity is the Lord Adinath (Rishabh Dev). The ancient Shri Digambara Jain temple of Sanganer has fine carvings that are comparable to the Dilwara Temples of Mount Abu that are built in many phases. The last phase of this temple was completed in the 10th century A.D., according to inscription of V.S. 1011 in one of the Toranas. It has sky-high shikharas and the inner sanctum is a stone shrine with sky-high eight shikharas (pinnacles).

In the midst of underground portion, there is located an ancient small temple guarded by the Yaksha. The sacred temple has seven underground floors which are kept closed due to old religious beliefs and visitors are not allowed to see them.  It is said that only a Balyati ascetic Digambara saint can enter in it and able to bring out the idols of this underground temple for a limited period, which is declared and decided previously. The idols thus brought out for viewing (Darshan) of devotees, must be placed back within auspicious signs. The temple came in light when Muni Sudhasagar Ji, a disciple of Acharya Vidyasagar Ji visited the underground floors. He brought valuable, never seen before, Jain Murti made of precious stones from the underground floors in the presence of more than five lac Jain disciples.

He claimed that he encountered many Yaksha in form of snakes who were there to protect the treasure and ordinary people cannot enter into the underground floors without seeking permission from the protector gods. The process of bringing Murti and keeping back was telecast live on various TV channels and widely covered by media.

Villages 

 Abhaipura
 Acharawala
 Ajairajpura
 Ajairajpura
 Anoppura
 Asawala
 Awaniya
 Badanpura
 Bagru Khurd 
 Bagru Rawan
 Baksawala
 Balawala
 Balmukundpura @ Nada 
 Barh Ajairajpura
 Barh Awaniya
 Barh Hariharpura
 Barh Shyopur
 Barhmohanpura
 Bari Ka Bas
 Beelwa Kalan 
 Bhambhoriya
 Bhankrota Khurd
 Bhaosinghpura
 Bhapura
 Bhater
 Chak Amjhar
 Chak Basri
 Chak Harbanspura
 Chak No 6 (Chak Kitavti)
 Chak No.12
 Chak No.7
 Chak Saligrampura
 Chak Sherwali
 Chakwatika
 Chatarpura
 Chatarpura@ Lalya Ka Bas
 Chhitroli
 Chimanpura
 Chirota
 Dahmi Kalan
 Dahmi Khurd
 Dantli
 Daulatpura
 Dayalpura
 Devisinghpura
 Ganwar Brahmanan
 Ganwar Jatan
 Ghegha
 Girdharipura
 Goner
 Harbanshpura
 Harchandpura @ Deoliya
 Hardhyanpura
 Hargun Ki Nangal@Charanwala
 Hariharpura
 Hasampura
 Hasampura Bas Neota
 Jagannathpura
 Jagat Sharvanpura 
 Jaichandpura
 Jaijaspura
 Jaisinghpura
 Jaisinghpura @ Bas Beelwa
 Jaisinghpura @ Buhariya
 Jaisinghpura @ Roopwas
 Jaisinghpura @ Tejawala
 Jaisinghpura Bas Jeerota
 Jaisinghpura Bas Neota
 Jatawala
 Jeerota
 Jhanyee
 Jhund
 Kalwara
 Kapoorawala
 Khatwara
 Kheri Gokulpura
 Khetapura
 Khoosar
 Kishanpura @ Khatipura
 Kishorpura
 Kodar
 Lakhana
 Lakhawas
 Lakshminarayanpura
 Laxmipura
 Laxmipura @ Nataniwala
 Mahapura
 Mahasinghpura @ Keshyawala
 Mandau
 Manohariya Wala
 Manpur Nagalya
 Manpura @ Bhatawala
 Manpura Teelawala
 Mathurawala
 Mohanpura
 Muhana
 Murlipura @ Mishra Ka Barh
 Nanakpura @ Hema Ki Nangal
 Nangal Bar Goojran@Phagodiyawala
 Narottampura
 Narsinghpura
 Narsinghpura @ Dadiya
 Narwariya
 Neota
 Palri Parsa
 Pawaliya
 Peepla Bharatsingh
 Prahladpura
 Prempura
 Prithvisinghpura @ Naiwala
 Purshottampura @ Dadiya
 Ramchandpura
 Ramdattpura
 Ramjipura Bas Neota
 Rampura @ Kanwarpura
 Rampura Unti
 Rampurawas Deoliya
 Ramsinghpura
 Ratalya
 Saligrampura
 Sanjariya
 Sanwant Ka Bas
 Sarangpura
 Seesyawas
 Shri Kishanpura
 Shri Ram Ki Nangal
 Shri Rampura
 Shyampura Buhariya
 Shyosinghpura
 Shyosinghpura @ Kallawala
 Sirani
 Siroli
 Sitapura Bas Sanjhariya
 Sitarampura
 Sukhdeopura @ Nataniwala
 Sukhdeopura @ Nohara
 Surajpura
 Teelawas
 Thikariya
 Vidhani
 Vimalpura
 Watika

References 

Cities and towns in Jaipur district
Neighbourhoods in Jaipur